Mikhail Nikolayevich Kedrov (2 January 1894 – 22 March 1972), was a Soviet stage director, actor and pedagogue who managed the Moscow Art Theatre between 1946 and 1955. He is considered one of Konstantin Stanislavski's most brilliant disciples.

The son of an Orthodox priest from Moscow, Kedrov studied for six years in a divinity school. His wife Maria Titova (1899–1994) joined Stanislavski's company in 1924. Kedrov was awarded the title of People's Artist of the USSR (1948) and was the winner of four Stalin Prizes first degree (1946, 1949, 1950, 1952). He headed the Stanislavski school in Moscow and taught Yuri Lyubimov, among many other notable actors. He died in Moscow and was buried at Vagankovo Cemetery.

References

External links 

 

1894 births
1972 deaths
20th-century Russian male actors
Academic staff of the Gerasimov Institute of Cinematography
Academic staff of Moscow Art Theatre School
Male actors from Moscow
Theatre directors from Moscow
Honored Artists of the RSFSR
People's Artists of the RSFSR
People's Artists of the USSR
Stalin Prize winners
Recipients of the Order of Lenin
Recipients of the Order of the Red Banner of Labour
Russian drama teachers
Russian male film actors
Russian male stage actors
Russian opera directors
Russian theatre directors

Soviet drama teachers
Soviet male film actors
Soviet male stage actors
Soviet opera directors
Soviet theatre directors
Burials at Vagankovo Cemetery